Lennox and Addington was an electoral district of the Legislative Assembly of the Parliament of the Province of Canada, in Canada West (now Ontario). Based on the combined counties of Lennox and Addington, it was created in 1841, upon the establishment of the Province of Canada by the union of Upper Canada and Lower Canada. 

Lennox and Addington was represented by one member in the Legislative Assembly.  It was abolished in 1867, upon the creation of Canada and the province of Ontario.

Boundaries 

Lennox and Addington electoral district was located in the eastern area of Canada West.  It extended from the Bay of Quinte on the north shore of Lake Ontario north to the Ottawa River.

The Union Act, 1840 had merged the two provinces of Upper Canada and Lower Canada into the Province of Canada, with a single Parliament.  The separate parliaments of Lower Canada and Upper Canada were abolished.Union Act, 1840, 3 & 4 Vict. (UK), c. 35, s. 2.  The Union Act provided that the pre-existing electoral boundaries of Upper Canada would continue to be used in the new Parliament, unless altered by the Union Act itself.

Lennox and Addington Counties had been an electoral district in the Legislative Assembly of Upper Canada.  Their boundaries were not altered by the Union Act.  Those boundaries had originally been set by a proclamation of the first Lieutenant Governor of Upper Canada, John Graves Simcoe, in 1792, defining the two separate counties of Addington and Lennox (originally called Lenox):

The boundaries had been further defined by a statute of Upper Canada in 1798:

Since Lennox and Addington were not changed by the Union Act, those boundaries continued to be used for the new electoral district.

Members of the Legislative Assembly 

The district of Lennox and Addington was represented by one member in the Legislative Assembly. The following were the members for Lennox and Addington.

Abolition 

The electoral district was abolished on July 1, 1867, when the British North America Act, 1867 came into force, creating Canada and splitting the Province of Canada into Quebec and Ontario.  It was succeeded by electoral districts of Leeds North and Leeds South in both the House of Commons of Canada and the Legislative Assembly of Ontario.

References 

.

Electoral districts of Canada West